Salami Rural District may refer to:
 Salami Rural District (Khuzestan Province)
 Salami Rural District (Razavi Khorasan Province)